Cockspur Rum is a rum beverage from the Eastern Caribbean island nation of Barbados.  It has been produced by Hanschell Inniss Ltd. since 1884. It has a rooster as its emblem.

Barbados is the country of origin of rumbullion, as it was originally called in the 18th century. Danish merchant Valdemar Hanschell established a liquor store in the 19th century where the rum was first distilled. Cockspur blends its rum while aging it in oak barrels, and it contains forty percent alcohol by volume.

The rum won the "International Wine and Spirit Competition's" Gold Medal in 1981, 1984, and 1989.  Proof66.com listed Cockspur among its "Top 20 rated rums in the world".

Hanschell Inniss sponsored a three-year deal between 1987 and 1990 with the England and Wales Cricket Board (ECB) to sponsor the National Club Championship.  This was renamed the "Cockspur Cup" for 2004.

References

External links
 Cockspur Rum Online

Drink companies of Barbados
Barbadian brands
Rums
Alcoholic drink brands